Wkra is a river in north-eastern Poland, a tributary of the Narew river, with a length of 255 kilometres and a basin area of 5,348 km² - all within Poland. Among its tributaries are the Łydynia and the Płonka.

Towns and townships:
 Bieżuń
 Radzanów
 Strzegowo
 Glinojeck
 Sochocin
 Joniec
 Pomiechówek
 Nowy Dwór Mazowiecki

See also:
Rivers of Poland

References

Rivers of Poland
Rivers of Warmian-Masurian Voivodeship
Rivers of Masovian Voivodeship